The 2005 UAW-GM Quality 500 was the stock car racing race of the 2005 NASCAR Nextel Cup Series season, the fifth race of the 2005 Chase for the Nextel Cup, and the 46th iteration of the event. The race was held on Saturday, October 15, 2005, before a crowd of 165,000 in Concord, North Carolina, at Lowe's Motor Speedway, a 1.5 miles (2.4 km) permanent quad-oval. The race was extended from its scheduled 334 laps to 336 laps due to a green–white–checker finish. At race's end, Jimmie Johnson of Hendrick Motorsports would hold off the field on the final restart to win his 18th career NASCAR Nextel Cup Series win and his fourth and final win of the season. To fill out the podium, Kurt Busch and Greg Biffle of Roush Racing would finish second and third, respectively.

Background 

Lowe's Motor Speedway is a motorsports complex located in Concord, North Carolina, United States 13 miles from Charlotte, North Carolina. The complex features a 1.5 miles (2.4 km) quad oval track that hosts NASCAR racing including the prestigious Coca-Cola 600 on Memorial Day weekend and the NEXTEL All-Star Challenge, as well as the UAW-GM Quality 500. The speedway was built in 1959 by Bruton Smith and is considered the home track for NASCAR with many race teams located in the Charlotte area. The track is owned and operated by Speedway Motorsports Inc. (SMI) with Marcus G. Smith (son of Bruton Smith) as track president.

Entry list 

*Withdrew.

Practice

First practice 
The first practice session was held on Thursday, October 13, at 1:00 PM EST and would last for 50 minutes.

Second practice 
The second practice session was held on Thursday, October 13, at 3:10 PM EST and would last for an hour and 10 minutes.

Third practice 
The third practice session was held on Friday, October 14, at 4:30 PM EST and would last for 45 minutes.

Fourth and final practice 
The fourth and final practice session, sometimes referred to as Happy Hour, was held on Friday, October 14, at 6:10 PM EST and would last for 45 minutes.

Qualifying 
Qualifying was held on Thursday, October 13, at 7:10 PM EST. Each driver would have two laps to set a fastest time; the fastest of the two would count as their official qualifying lap.

Six drivers would fail to qualify: Boris Said, Carl Long, Jimmy Spencer, Mike Garvey, P. J. Jones, and Stanton Barrett.

Full qualifying results

Race results

References 

2005 NASCAR Nextel Cup Series
NASCAR races at Charlotte Motor Speedway
October 2005 sports events in the United States
2005 in sports in North Carolina